Bloomington Transit is the provider of mass transportation in Bloomington, Indiana. 13 routes are operated, with many connected to Indiana University. It is owned by the Bloomington Public Transportation Corporation, a municipal corporation.

Route list
There are 13 regularly scheduled bus routes.
Route 1 North - Fee Lane / BHS North 
Route 1 South - South Walnut / Arbor Glen 
Route 2 South - South Rogers / Countryview 
Route 2 West - 11th Street via Showers Complex 
Route 3 East - College Mall / Bradford Place 
Route 3 West - Highland Village /Curry Pike 
Route 4 South - High Street / Sherwood Oaks 
Route 4 West - Bloomfield Road / Heatherwood 
Route 5 - Sare Road 
Route 6 - Campus Shuttle / Route 6 Limited 
Route 7 - Henderson / Walnut Express 
Route 8 - Eastside Local 
Route 9 – IU Campus / College Mall / Campus Corner

References

Bus transportation in Indiana
Bloomington, Indiana
RATP Group
Transportation in Monroe County, Indiana
Transit agencies in Indiana